TIROS-I may refer to:
 TIROS-1, the first TIROS satellite
 TIROS-9, the ninth TIROS satellite